Mahmut Ertuğrul Taşkıran (born 5 November 1989) is a Turkish professional footballer who plays as a goalkeeper for Süper Lig club Kasımpaşa.

Club career
Taşkıran joined the Fenerbahçe academy ahead of the 2007–08 season from childhood club Kartalspor. 

He would go on to make his professional debut while on loan at Samsunspor, replacing Álvaro Domínguez after starting goalkeeper Ahmet Şahin was sent off in a 3–1 loss to Galatasaray on 18 September 2011. He would remain Samsunspor's starter for the rest of the 2011–12 season.

Honours
Fenerbahçe
 Turkish Super Cup: 2009
 Süper Lig: 2010–11

Individual
 Toulon Tournament Best Goalkeeper: 2012

References

External links
 
 
Ertuğrul Taşkıran on Fenerbahçe 
TFF.org profil 

1989 births
Living people
Footballers from Istanbul
Turkey youth international footballers
Fenerbahçe S.K. footballers
Süper Lig players
Association football goalkeepers
Turkey B international footballers
Samsunspor footballers
Kayserispor footballers
Sivasspor footballers
Boluspor footballers
Konyaspor footballers
Turkish footballers
Kasımpaşa S.K. footballers